Makola is a town in the Gampaha District of Sri Lanka.

References 

Populated places in Gampaha District